Macrorie is a village in the Canadian province of Saskatchewan within the Rural Municipality of Fertile Valley No. 285 and Census Division No. 12. The village contains a Co-op gas and grocery store. Danielson Provincial Park is 20 km southeast on Highway 44.

History 
Macrorie incorporated as a village on February 8, 1912.

Demographics 

Notable people

Howard Fredeen (born December 10, 1921 in Macrorie) is a Canadian animal breeding researcher.

See also 

 List of communities in Saskatchewan
 Villages of Saskatchewan

References

Villages in Saskatchewan
Fertile Valley No. 285, Saskatchewan
Division No. 12, Saskatchewan